Floriana Panella (born 15 December 1980), best known by the stage name Roberta Gemma or Roberta Missoni, is an Italian actress related to porn and horror movies.

Biography 
She started her career in 2006. In 2008, she won the Miss Maglietta Bagnata pageant. That same year, Gemma was the "madrina" and the hostess of the PesarHorrorFest, a horror film festival set in Pesaro. She has starred in several horror and comedy films.

Horror filmography
 House of Flesh Mannequins (2009)
 Bloody Sin (2011)
 The Transparent Woman (2015)
 A Taste of Phobia (2017)

Awards and nominations
2006 Eroticline Awards winner - Best Newcomer International
2007 Eroticline Awards winner - Outstanding Achievement
2008 Eroticline Awards - Best Cross Over Star 2008 International
2010 Venus Awards - Best Female Performer Europe
2011 Venus Awards - Best Female Performer Europe
2012 Venus Awards - Crossover Star

References

External links

 
 

1980 births
Living people
People from Marino, Lazio
Italian pornographic film actresses